National Unionist Party (EEK) is a former Greek Centre-left political party founded in 1935 by Panagiotis Kanellopoulos and other Venizelist politicians. The party had democratic, progressive and liberal ideas.

After the Second World War, the party elected some MPs in the Hellenic Parliament. In 1950, the party was continued by National Reconstruction Front.

Political parties established in 1935
1950 disestablishments in Greece
Liberal parties in Greece